Walter Mercado Salinas (9 March 1932 – 2 November 2019), also known by his stage name Shanti Ananda, was a Puerto Rican astrologer, actor, dancer, and writer, best known as a television personality for his shows as an astrologer. His astrological prediction shows aired for decades in Puerto Rico, Latin America and the United States, and he became a cultural phenomenon in the Hispanic community.

Early years 
Mercado was born on 9 March 1932, in Ponce, Puerto Rico, where he spent his early childhood. His parents were José María Mercado, from San Germán, Puerto Rico, and Aída Salinas from Catalonia, Spain. Mercado believed that he had spiritual abilities, even as a child. He attended university majoring in pedagogy, psychology and pharmacy, and used these skills to teach others, to study the human mind and to learn about the healing properties of medicinal plants.

Professional career

Dancing and acting 
Mercado Salinas studied singing and had a talent for dancing. He also studied classical and modern ballet. He was one of the most prolific dancers in Puerto Rico. He was the dancing partner of comedian Velda González.

Walter Mercado worked as an actor in the 1960s Puerto Rican telenovelas Un adiós en el recuerdo (A Farewell to the Memory) and Larga distancia (Long Distance), and also had a dramatic arts school called Walter Actors Studio 64.

Astrology 

His TV debut as an entertainer came when Puerto Rican producer Elín Ortíz invited him to perform on his TV show when one guest artist did not show up. Walter Mercado happened to be at the station and Ortiz asked Mercado to use the 25-minute allotment scheduled for the other guest, to make astrological predictions wearing colorful and extravagant robes. After that, Mercado was made a regular in the show making astrological predictions. He would frequently appear in heavily decorated costumes and capes.

In 1970, Mercado started his regular astrology segment in El Show de las 12. He enhanced his studies with formal study into astrology, tarot, and other occult disciplines. Mercado hosted a weekly astrology television show at WKAQ-TV, Channel 2/Telemundo. After several years, when the network changed its programming, Mercado moved his show to WRIK-TV (channel 7 in Ponce) where he hosted it for many years. Westinghouse was a steady and long-time sponsor. In the 1980s, his show was seen on several TV channels throughout Latin America and the United States. When Tommy Muñiz bought WRIK-TV, Mercado stayed for two years then moved his show to WKBM-TV, Channel 11/Tele Once (later renamed WLII-TV/Univision). In addition to the TV programs, Mercado also wrote his predictions for newspapers, magazines, and web pages. He was a syndicated writer in the Miami Herald. He also appeared on various radio segments.

In 1986, Mercado was awarded the title Mr. Televisión by the Asociación de Cronistas del Espectáculo de Nueva York (Association of Latin Entertainment Critics of New York). By the end of the 1980s, Mercado had authored seven books, of which one, Más allá del horizonte (Beyond the Horizon), was published in three languages (Spanish, English and Portuguese).

From the mid-1990s until 2010, Mercado's show aired in the Univision network throughout the Americas, but on 8 January 2010, after a fifteen-year relationship, he announced that he and Univision had parted ways. He was managed by entrepreneur Bill Bakula. In 2005, he was invited to appear on Welsh singer/songwriter Lisa Scott-Lee’s show Totally Scott-Lee to give her a special reading. From 1994 to 2009, he also appeared on Primer Impacto, which airs on the Univision network in the United States.

Other ventures Mercado was involved with in the mid-2010s included a dating website; a line of Zodiac-themed soaps and hygiene items; and a popular personal website and app offering daily horoscopes and more. His eponymous website received over 1 million visits in the first month. On a limited basis, Mercado continued to make public appearances during this time period as well.

Name change and legal challenge 
In October 2010, Mercado changed his name to "Shanti Ananda", a translation in Sanskrit of "peace happiness." He says a "being of light" imparted a spiritual revelation to him, which he refers to as his "authentic mystic name."

In January 2012, Mercado lost a lawsuit against Bart Enterprises International. He was trying to prevent it from using his name and likeness in future commercial ventures. Mercado signed a contract with the company in 1995. He severed ties with the company in 2006, which resulted in litigation being filed by both parties against each other. Chief Judge Sandra Lynch of the United States Court of Appeals for the First Circuit ruled that Bart Enterprises can continue using Mercado's name and likeness in future commercial projects. When asked about his legal case over the rights to his name, he replied, "I worked for many years, and gave some releases without thinking much about human wickedness."

Personal life 
In 2003, he announced that he maintained a "spiritual relationship" with the Brazilian actress and dancer Mariette Detotto, with whom he shared a TV program. In archival and recent interview clips on his life shown in a 2020 documentary, Mucho Mucho Amor: The Legend of Walter Mercado, Mercado defined himself as androgynous and insisted that the primary relationship of his life was with his fans; he also joked about being a virgin into his 80s. He always maintained his residence in Puerto Rico.

Decline in health and death 

In January 2012, Mercado was flown to Cleveland Clinic, Cleveland, Ohio, with cardiac problems. He said he "had gone and seen death and came back to life again". Since the experience he said he had changed. He said he wanted to work with Puerto Rican youth, he planned to establish the Shanti Ananda foundation, create a mystic center, and donated three of his capes to a museum. Most of his capes had already been sold at auctions.

Mercado died on the night of Saturday, 2 November 2019, reportedly from kidney failure, at Auxilio Mutuo Hospital in San Juan, Puerto Rico, according to hospital spokeswoman Sofia Luquis. He was 87. He is buried at Señorial Memorial Park in Cupey barrio, San Juan, Puerto Rico.

Accolades 
 Awarded Mr. Televisión title by the Association of Latin Entertainment Critics of New York.<ref name="Walter Mercado.">[http://prpop.org/biografias/walter-mercado/ Walter Mercado.] Fundación Nacional para la Cultura Popular. San Juan, Puerto Rico. 6 July 2014. Accessed 19 March 2017.</ref>
 Awarded Señor Televisión title at the 1972 Festival de Codazos in the Dominican Republic.

 Works 

 Television 
 Historia de mi vida (1963)
 Ana Rosa (1965)
 La mujer de aquella noche (1968)
 Recordar (1968)
 Entre el puñal y la cruz (1969)
 Una sombra (1970)
 La intrusa (1970)
 Renzo el gitano (1971)
 Totally Scott-Lee (2005)
 Doritos advertisement (PepsiCo, 2016)

Theatre 
Source:
 Anastasia
 Bodas de sangre
 La dama de las camelias
 Androcles y el león
 Los cuatro coroneles
 El tríptico de amor, dolor y muerte
 Todos los hijos de Dios tienen alas (1960)
 Look Back in Anger (Mirando hacia atrás con ira) (1970)

Discography 
Source:
 Walter '84 (1984)
 Walter '86 (1986, Sonotone)
 Walter Mercado (1986)
 Guía para una vida mejor (1997)

Filmography 
 Una mujer sin precio (1966) (choreographer)
 Hoy (2003)
 Chasing Papi (2003)
 Mucho Mucho Amor: The Legend of Walter Mercado (posthumous Netflix documentary, 2020)

Books 
 Mensajes Para Vivir, co-authored with Dr. Leon Alberto Vasquez (unknown date)
 Enciclopedia De Walter Mercado (Tomo 1) (1983)
 Más allá del horizonte (Beyond the Horizon: Visions of the New Millennium) (1997)
 Guia Para Una Vida Mejor (1997)
 El Mundo secreto de Walter Mercado (Spanish Edition) (2010)

See also 

 List of Puerto Ricans
 List of people from Ponce, Puerto Rico

Notes

References

External links 
 
 

1932 births
2019 deaths
20th-century astrologers
21st-century astrologers
Artists from Ponce
Male actors from Ponce, Puerto Rico
Puerto Rican astrologers
Puerto Rican dancers
Puerto Rican television personalities
Puerto Rican people of Catalan descent
Puerto Rican writers
Writers from Ponce